Eucalyptus orgadophila, commonly known as mountain coolibah, is a species of medium-sized tree that is endemic to Queensland. It has rough, fibrous or flaky bark on the lower trunk, smooth white to greyish above, lance-shaped adult leaves, flower buds in groups of seven, white flowers and cup-shaped to barrel-shaped fruit.

Description
It has rough, grey, flaky or fibrous bark on the lower trunk, smooth white to greyish bark above. Flowering occurs between February and September and the flowers are white.

Taxonomy
Eucalyptus orgadophila was first formally described in 1928 by Joseph Maiden and William Blakely in Maiden's book, A Critical Revision of the Genus Eucalyptus. The type material was collected by Cyril Tenison White near Cooranga in 1925. The specific epithet is from ancient Greek meaning "a meadow or well-watered, fertile spot" and "loving".

Distribution and habitat
Mountain coolibah grows in woodland, often in pure stand, on ridges and hills in eastern Queensland, from south of the Cape York Peninsula to near Warwick.

Conservation status
This eucalypt is classified as "least concern" under the Queensland Government Nature Conservation Act 1992.

See also
List of Eucalyptus species

References

Trees of Australia
orgadophila
Myrtales of Australia
Flora of Queensland
Plants described in 1928
Taxa named by William Blakely
Taxa named by Joseph Maiden